This article lists the winners and nominees for the Black Reel Award for Outstanding Supporting Actress in a Television Movie or Limited Series. The category was retired during the 2008 ceremony, but later returned in 2013. In May 2017 the category was moved from the film awards as part of the Black Reel Awards for Television honors thus resulting in two separate winners in 2017.

Winners and nominees
Winners are listed first and highlighted in bold.

2000s

2010s

2020s

Superlatives

Programs with multiple awards

3 wins 
 American Crime

Performers with multiple awards

3 wins
 Regina King

 2 Wins
 Cicely Tyson
 Alfre Woodard

Programs with multiple nominations

3 nominations
 American Crime
 A Day Late and a Dollar Short
 A Lesson Before Dying
 Lackawanna Blues
 When They See Us

2 nominations
 American Horror Story
 Black Mirror
 Marvel's the Defenders
 Disappearing Acts
 Roots
 Shots Fired
 Small Axe
 The Wiz Live!''

Performers with multiple nominations

 3 Nominations 
 Carmen Ejogo
 Regina King

 2 Nominations
 Lisa Arrindell Anderson
 Angela Bassett
 Viola Davis
 Loretta Devine
 Kimberly Elise
 Aisha Hinds
 Mo'Nique
 C. C. H. Pounder
 Anika Noni Rose
 Jurnee Smollett
 Cicely Tyson
 Alfre Woodard
 Letitia Wright

Total awards by network
 ABC - 3
 HBO - 3
 Lifetime - 3
 Netflix - 2
 Showtime - 2
 CBS - 1
 FX - 1
 Hallmark - 1
 HULU - 1
 PBS - 1

References

Black Reel Awards
Television awards for Best Supporting Actress